Thétis was a 40-gun  frigate of the French Navy.

From 1790, she served in various diplomatic missions in the Indian Ocean, before returning for a refit in Brest in 1793. From 1795, she was shuttled from France to Guadeloupe. She took part in the Invisible Squadron of Zacharie Allemand, before returning to Martinique along with the 16-gun brig .

On 17 December 1806, Thétis and the brig  captured . The French sold Netley and she became the privateer Duquesne. Less than nine months later, on 23 September 1807, HMS Blonde captured Dusquesne. (The Chroniques de la Marine Française report that in 1807, Thétis captured an 18-gun brig named Methly. This may be a slightly garbled reference to the capture of Netley, there being no Royal Navy vessel named Methly.)

 captured Thétis off Lorient in the action of 10 November 1808. British casualties in the engagement were severe, with 19 killed and 51 wounded, but French losses were several times larger, with 135 dead, including her commander, Capitaine de Vaisseau Jacques Pinsum, and 102 wounded. The Royal Navy took her into service as HMS Brune.

Brune was broken up in 1838.

References

External links
 

Frigates of the Royal Navy
Ships built in France
Age of Sail frigates of France
1788 ships
Nymphe-class frigates
Captured ships